Grey Ukraine (also: Grey Klyn - Siryi Klyn; Ukrainian: Сірий Клин, also: Сіра Україна - "Grey Ukraine"; Russian: Серый Клин) is an unofficial name for a region in Southern Siberia and Northern Kazakhstan, where mass settlement of Ukrainians took place from the middle of the 18th to the beginning of the 20th century. Around 1917-1920 there was a movement for Ukrainian autonomy in the region.

History

The Ukrainian settlement of Siryi Klyn (literally: the "grey wedge") developed around the city of Omsk in western Siberia. M. Bondarenko, an emigrant from Poltava province, wrote before World War I: "The city of Omsk looks like a typical Moscovite city, but the bazaar and markets speak Ukrainian". Altogether, before 1914, 1,604,873 emigrants from Ukraine settled in the area.

Historical Grey Ukraine exists roughly within the present-day northern Kazakhstan and southern Siberia. It is not contiguous with other territories inhabited by Ukrainian diaspora, in a similar situation of territorial isolation as with Green Ukraine.

Most of the Ukrainian migrations to Siberia happened between the mid-18th century and early 20th century. After conquering it in the early 18th century, the Russian Empire decided to resettle the region by handing 40% of newly created settlements there to Ukrainian settlers and 30% to Russian and Belarusian settlers. By 1897, Ukrainians made up 7.5% of the population in Akmolinsk Oblast, which contained Omsk and surrounding regions. Although the Russian Empire had tolerated expressions of Ukrainian identity, and the Soviet Union had initially adopted a Ukrainization policy in the region, by the end of 1932 the Ukrainization policy was reversed and the Ukrainian identity strongly declined. Migration to the region continued throughout the Soviet period, and Nikita Khrushchev's virgin lands campaign during the 1950s encouraged further migration from across the Soviet Union.

Demographics
In the Russian census of 1897, 51,103 people identified themselves as Little Russians (Ukrainians) in Akmolinsk (Omsk) Oblast, making up 7.5% of the population and forming the third-largest ethnic group after Kazakhs (62.6%) and Russians (25.5%). According to the 2010 Russian census, 77,884 people (2.7%) of the Omsk Oblast identified themselves as Ukrainians, making Ukrainians the third-largest ethnic group there, after Russians and Kazakhs.

See also
Yellow Ukraine
Green Ukraine
Ukrainians in Siberia

References

External links

Map showing location of Grey Ukraine

Ukrainian diaspora in Russia
Ukrainian diaspora in Siberia
Ukrainian diaspora in Kazakhstan
Cultural regions